Unto the Weak is a 1914 American silent short drama film starring Charlotte Burton, William Bertram, Ed Coxen, George Field, and Ida Lewis.

External links

1914 films
1914 drama films
Silent American drama films
American silent short films
American black-and-white films
1914 short films
1910s American films